Hockey Club Bilyi Bars Bila Tserkva is a Ukrainian team based in Bila Tserkva, Ukraine. The club was a founding member of the Professional Hockey League of Ukraine and now playing in the Ukrainian Hockey League.

History
The Bilyi Bars were founded in 2008. They began play in Brovary (Kyiv Oblast).

Twice that team won the silver of the Ukrainian Hockey Championship (2008, 2009)

In 2012, the club found a new sponsor. The team moved permanently to Bila Tserkva on October 28, 2012 from Brovary, the city where they were founded. Following this, the team changed its name from HSK Bilyi Bars to HC Bilyi Bars Bila Tserkva.

The home arena was opened on December 7, 2012.

During the 2013–14 season, the club were acting as a farm team to HC Donbass, that was playing in the Kontinental Hockey League at that time.

In 2014 the club won the third silver at the Ukrainian Championship. The name of the team playing up to the last minute has been assigned to Bilyi Bars.

The hockey club actively participates in the Ukrainian hockey Movement. 25 July 2011 Bilyi Bars were at a meeting of the ice hockey teams that created The Professional Hockey League. In the 2011–12 season, Bilyi Bars took the 7th place out of eight participants.

In the 2014–15 season, the team did not participate in the Ukrainian Hockey Championship.

3 June 2016 "Bilyi Bars" co-founded Ukrainian Hockey League that reorganized the Ukrainian Hockey Championship.

Since the beginning of its activity, Bilyi Bars HC relies on young Ukrainian hockey players, and in particular on youth from Bila Tserkva. Many hockey players who defended the colors of the junior and youth national teams of Ukraine passed the school team. In particular, the champions in the second division junior championship (U18) in 2011 were three former players of the club, and in the youth championship (U20) in 2012 - two former players. Therefore, the club received the informal title of Forge of personnel, which is his main achievement.

The 2017/2018 season has so far been the best in the history of the club - it finished 2nd in the standings (repeating the result of the 2013/2014 season) and scored 84 points.

September 5, 2019 Oleksandr Bobkin (assistant head coach) Becomes Senior Coach of the Junior National Team of Ukraine (U-18).

Present

The Bilyi Bars  Juniors 
The Bilyi Bars pays much attention to youngsters. The young hockey players graduated from the sports school of the team, who played for the national team of Ukraine (Minor league). For example, in 2011 three Bilyi Bars  became champions in the second division (U18). In 2012, two Leopards became champions (U20).

The HC "Bilyi Bars" owns the affiliate junior teams: U20, U17, U16, U15. Also the hockey club takes younger children to his school.

In April 2018, club juniors Mikhail Vasilyev, Bogdan Gritsyuk, Dmytro Danylenko, Sergei Logach, Feliks Morozov played for the Ukraine men's national under-18 ice hockey team (2018 IIHF World U18 Championship Division I B). Danilenko showed better result (3 goals and 5 assists). Morozov has 4 goals and 3 assists, Logach has 1 assist, Vasiliev has 1 assist. Danilenko has taken 2nd position, Morozov has taken 4th position in the overall rating of Division I B. Logach and Vasiliev took the 13th position in the ranking of defencemans.

Now Bilyi Bars recruit children in a sports school that were born in 2002—2003, 2005—2006, 2007—2008 and 2009—2011. Children's teams from Bila Tserkva go to the Ukrainian championships and specialized tournaments.

In the 2018/2019 season, the Bilyi Bars youth team became the junior champion of Ukraine.

Coaching staff

Konstantin Butsenko

Mr. Butsenko is the sport master of the international class. It is permanent head coach of team (except for 2013–14 season). He played for Dynamo Kharkov, Sokil Kyiv, Avangard Omsk, Spartak Moscow, Neftekhimik Nizhnekamsk, SKA Saint Petersburg etc.

He played in the Ukrainian national team in 1993, 1994, 1998, 1999. At the world championships he got the result: 23 games played, 14 goals, 20 assists.

Olexandr Bobkin
Olexander Bobkin is assistant coach since 2015.
He is the sport master of the international class, ex player of the Ukrainian national team. Mr. Bobkin played for Lokomotiv Yaroslavl, Berkut-Kyiv, Neftekhimik Nizhnekamsk, Sibir Novosibirsk, Neftyanik Almetyevsk, Sokil Kyiv, Donbass, ATEK etc.

He played in the Ukrainian national team: 29 games played, 9 goals, 12 assists. Mr. Bobkin is champion of Ukraine (2006, 2007, 2008, 2011, 2015).

On September 5, 2019 he became the senior coach of the U-18 junior team of Ukraine.

Vitaliy Litvinenko
Vitali Litvinenkoy is assistant coach since 2017. He is played for Dynamo Kharkov, Sokil Kyiv, Bilyi Bars, Lokomotiv Yaroslavl, Lada Togliatti, Torpedo Nizhny Novgorod, Gomel etc.

Mr. Litvinenko played in the Ukrainian national team: 154 games played, 43 goals, 61 assists. He played at the 2002 Winter Olympics etc.

Ice hockey statistics
Sources:

Note: GP = Games played, W = Wins, OTW = Overtime wins, OTL = Overtime Losses, L = Losses, GF = Goals for, GA = Goals against, Pts = Points

The current team roster
Updated March 5, 2018

Honors

Champions
IHFU Federation Cup: (1) 2008

Awards
  (2018) — the play off of the UHL.

References

External links
 Official team website

Ice hockey teams in Ukraine
Professional Hockey League teams
Sport in Bila Tserkva
Sport in Brovary
Ice hockey clubs established in 2008
2008 establishments in Ukraine